The episodes of the Vampire Knight anime adaptation is based on the manga series of the same name written by Matsuri Hino. They are directed by Kiyoko Sayama, and produced by Studio Deen and Nihon Ad Systems. The plot of the episodes follows Yuki Cross, a student at the Cross Academy, where she acts as a guardian of the "Day Class" along with vampire hunter Zero Kiryu from the secret vampires of the "Night Class" led by Kaname Kuran.

The first season premiered on TV Tokyo in Japan on April 7, 2008, and ran for thirteen episodes until the season's conclusion on June 30, 2008. The episodes were aired at later dates on TV Aichi, TV Hokkaido, TV Osaka, TV Setōchi, and TVQ Kyushu Broadcasting Co. The second season, named Vampire Knight Guilty, premiered on the same station on October 6, 2008 and ran until its conclusion on December 29, 2008. As of December 2008, five DVD compilations of the first season have been released by Aniplex and Sony Pictures between July 23, 2008 and November 26, 2008. The first DVD compilation for the second season was released by Aniplex on January 28, 2009, and the second compilation was released on February 25, 2009.

The series is licensed by Viz Media, who is streaming episodes of their Viz Anime website and broadcasting dubbed episodes on their online network, Neon Alley.

Four pieces of theme music are used for the episodes: two opening themes and two closing themes. The original soundtrack for the series was released on June 25, 2008.

Series overview

Episode list

Vampire Knight (2008)

Vampire Knight Guilty (2008)

DVD releases
The Region 2 DVD compilations of the Vampire Knight episodes are released in Japan by Aniplex and Sony Pictures. As of November 2008, five DVD compilations have been released, containing the entire first season. The first DVD compilation for the second season was released on January 28, 2009, and the last was released on May 27, 2009.

References
General

Specific

External links
 Official website for the anime (Archived) 
 Official TV Tokyo website for the anime 

Vampire Knight